Canteen Stores Department may refer to:

Canteen Stores Department (Bangladesh)
Canteen Stores Department (India)
Canteen Stores Department (Pakistan)